The Ricoh GR Digital II is a compact digital camera, the successor of the Ricoh GR Digital and one of a series of Ricoh GR digital cameras.

The GR Digital II first went on sale in Japan at the end of November 2007. It was succeeded by the Ricoh GR Digital III, Ricoh GR Digital IV and Ricoh GR.

Rather than have a zoom lens, instead its lens has a fixed focal length of 5.9 mm (28 mm equivalent angle of view (AOV) in 35 mm full frame format).

Features
 5.9 mm  lens (28 mm equivalent angle of view (AOV) in 35 mm full frame format)
 10 megapixel CCD image sensor
 Full manual controls
 Magnesium body
 New image processor
 Electronic leveler
 Option for 1:1 (square) aspect ratio

References

External links

 'Ricoh GR Digital' group on Flickr

Ricoh digital cameras